"Here She Comes" is a song by Australian rock band, The Androids. The song was released in February 2003 as the second single from the band's debut self-titled studio album. The song peaked at number 15 on the ARIA Charts.

Track listing
Australian CD single (021332)
 "Here She Comes" - 3:11	
 "Automatic" - 2:11
 "Straighten Up" - 1:47	
 "Don't Change" - 3:16	
 Video	"Do It with Madonna"

Charts

References

2003 singles
2003 songs
Mushroom Records singles